The 2014–15 Navy Midshipmen men's basketball team represented the United States Naval Academy during the 2014–15 NCAA Division I men's basketball season. The Midshipmen, led by fourth year head coach Ed DeChellis, played their home games at Alumni Hall and were members of the Patriot League. They finished the season 13–19, 8–10 in Patriot League play to finish in a three way tie for sixth place. They advanced to the quarterfinals of the Patriot League tournament where they lost to Colgate.

Roster

Schedule

|-
!colspan=9 style="background:#00005D; color:#D4AF37;"| Non-conference regular season

|-
!colspan=9 style="background:#00005D; color:#D4AF37;"| Conference regular season

|-
!colspan=9 style="background:#00005D; color:#D4AF37;"| Patriot League tournament

References

Navy Midshipmen men's basketball seasons
Navy
Navy
Navy